The 2016 North Carolina A&T Aggies football team represented North Carolina A&T State University as a member of Mid-Eastern Athletic Conference (MEAC) during the 2016 NCAA Division I FCS football season. Led by sixth-year head coach Rod Broadway, the Aggies compiled an overall record of 9–3 with a mark of 7–1 in conference play, placing second in the MEAC. North Carolina A&T received an at-large bid to the NCAA Division I Football Championship playoffs, where the Aggies lost in the first round to Richmond. North Carolina A&T played home games at Aggie Stadium in Greensboro, North Carolina.

Previous season
The Aggies finished the season 10–2, 7–1 in MEAC play to finish in a three-way tie, earning the school's 8th MEAC Championship and 13th overall. As a result of the MEAC Tiebreaker system, the Aggies were invited to represent the conference in the inaugural Celebration Bowl against Southwestern Athletic Conference Champion Alcorn State. The Aggies defeated Alcorn State earning their 4th Black college football national championship.

Before the season
At the conclusion of the 2015 football season, the Aggies lost key players such as quarterback Kwashaun Quick, who was the only quarterback in the program's history to finish with more than 2,000 passing and 1,000 rushing yards. In addition to Quick, the Aggies also lost defensive back Tony McRae, defensive tackle Michael Neal and linebackers Denzel Jones & Landis Shoffner.

Recruiting

Coaching staff

Schedule

Roster

Game summaries

St. Augustine's

This game marked the 4th meeting between Division II Saint Augustine's and the Aggies. The two teams have not faced each other since 1935 when the Aggies defeated the Falcons 33–0.  Going into the matchup, the Aggies held the all-time series at 2–0–1. The Aggies easily outmatched Saint Augustine's with performances such as quarterback Lamar Raynard's 17 completions and 2 touchdowns. Other top performances include running back Tarik Cohen's 2 touchdowns and 8 carries. Cohen now owns the school record for receiving and rushing touchdowns with a career number of 42.

Kent State

This game marked the first meeting between the Aggies and Division I FBS Kent State. Going into the game, A&T held an 0-3 all-time record against FBS opponents, while Kent State was 13-0 against FCS opponents over the last 15 years. The Aggies were able to upset the Golden Flashes with a 39-36 victory in 4 overtimes. Fifth-year senior quarterback Oluwafemi Bamiro threw the game-winning pass to Denzel Keyes securing the program's first ever victory over FBS competition.

Tulsa

This game marks the first meeting between the Aggies and Division I FBS Tulsa. The Golden Hurricanes were able to establish a commanding 48–0 lead by halftime. A&T's offense was held off by Tulsa's defense until late in the 3rd quarter, when the Aggies finally posted their first points of the game.

Hampton

This game marked the 45th meeting between A&T and Hampton. Going into the game, Hampton held a 26–17–2 all-time record against A&T. In their last two meetings, the Aggies had beaten Hampton by a combined 76-45, including their 45-31 victory last season in Hampton. Both the Aggies and Pirates went into the game with extra time to prepare courtesy of a bye week Hampton also faced the additional challenge of playing an A&T team that is 24-5 at home since 2011.

Tarik Cohen put in a 256-yard performance, including 3 touchdowns in the second half to give the Aggies their victory. His performance in this game broke 2 A&T school records; Cohen surpassed Stoney Polite's (1984–87) 41 career rushing touchdown record and also James White's 25 year record for longest run from scrimmage (89 yards).

Norfolk State

This game marked the 40th meeting between A&T and Norfolk State. Going into the game, The Aggies held a 29-11 all-time record against NSU. In their last meeting, the Aggies defeated the Spartans 27–3 in Norfolk.

Bethune-Cookman

This game marked the 37th meeting between the A&T and Bethune–Cookman. Going into the game, Bethune–Cookman held a 22–15 all-time record against the Aggies. In their last meeting, the Aggies defeated the Wildcats 24–14 in front of a home crowd in Greensboro. The Aggies scored 21 unanswered points in the fourth quarter for a come-from-behind win over Bethune–Cookman. Tarik Cohen finished the game with 220 yards and three touchdowns, a performance that made him the first player in A&T history to rush for at least 200 yards in three straight games. This game also saw quarterback Lamar Raynard throw for a career-high 277 yards and 3 touchdowns.

Howard

This game marked the 39th meeting between the A&T and Howard. Going into the game, A&T held a 27–20–2 all-time record against Howard. In their last meeting, the Aggies cruised to a 65–14 victory over the Bison in front of sold out Homecoming crowd at Aggie Stadium. The Aggies were able to cruise to a near shutout over Howard in Washington to play spoiler to the Bison's Homecoming. Quarterback Lamar Raynard threw 191 passing yards and 3 touchdowns; while Running back Tarik Cohen ran for 133 yards and 1 touchdown in the winning effort. Cohen's performance put him over 5,000 career rushing yards.

Florida A&M

This game will mark the 64th meeting between the A&T and Florida A&M. Going into the game, Florida A&M holds a 44-17-3 all-time record against the Aggies. In their last meeting, the Aggies defeated the Rattlers 28-10 in Tallahassee.

South Carolina State

This game will mark the 54rd meeting between the A&T and rival South Carolina State. Going into the game, South Carolina State holds a 32-19-2 all-time record against the Aggies. In their last meeting, the Aggies defeated the Bulldogs 9-6 in Orangeburg, SC.

Delaware State

This game marks the 45th meeting between the North Carolina A&T and Delaware State. Going into the game, both teams are tied at 22-22-1 in the all-time record against one another, with Delaware state holding the lead over A&T. In their last meeting, the Aggies tied the series when they defeated the Hornets 27-6 in Greensboro.

North Carolina Central

This game marks the 88th meeting between North Carolina A&T and arch rival North Carolina Central. Going into the game, the Aggies hold a 49–33–5 all-time record against the Eagles. In their last meeting, the Eagles upset the favored Aggies 21-16 in A&T's sole conference loss of the season. The Eagle victory took away sole possession of the MEAC championship from A&T, resulting in a 3-way tie for first place. The MEAC tiebreaker formula would then eliminate the Eagles and name A&T the conference's representative for the inaugural Celebration Bowl against Southwestern Athletic Conference champion Alcorn State.

FCS Playoffs

First Round–Richmond

This game marked the 1st meeting between North Carolina A&T and the University of Richmond. This was the program's fifth appearance in the FCS playoffs and their first at-large berth. A&T earned the playoff berth with combination of their #9 national ranking, their victory over FBS Kent State and their performance against Tulsa. The Aggies' last appearance in the FCS Playoffs was in 2003, losing in the first round to Wofford.

In the lead up to the match up, both the Aggies and Spiders were dealing with depth issues. Both teams suffered losses of their starting quarterbacks, with A&T losing Sophomore Lamar Raynard and Richmond losing Junior Kyle Lauletta. The Aggies started 3rd string Quarterback Oluwafemi Bamiro, while the Spiders tapped sophomore Kevin Johnson to make his season debut.

Johnson threw for 315 yards, including a 35-yard pass and 7-yard scoring run. The spiders were also able to neutralize running back Tarik Cohen, limiting him to only 70 yards from scrimmage and forcing Cohen's first fumble in 528 straight touches without one. Richmond also held the A&T to 226 offensive yards while gaining four turnovers.

Statistics

Post Season
As the 2016 college football season neared the end, many organizations began to announce finalists and winners of various past-season awards. Aggie players and coaches appeared on many of these lists. Several players for the Aggies were honored with awards and accolades including Wide Receiver Elijah Bell; Left Tackle Brandon Parker & Running Back Tarik Cohen.

Senior Tarik Cohen was awarded the Offensive Player of the year award for the third consecutive year, making him the first player in MEAC history to do so. Cohen also became the conference's all-time leading rusher, as his record-setting 1,588 rushing yards during the season extended his career total to 5,619. Cohen's performance placed him on the watch lists for both the Deacon Jones Trophy, which he was awarded, and the Walter Payton Award, where he ultimately finished fifth in the voting. In addition to setting new School and Conference rushing yardage records, Cohen broke the single-season touchdown record with 19 total. He also tied the school for the single-season rushing touchdowns record with 18; holds numerous school records including: rushing touchdowns, total touchdowns and total points at 56, 59 & 339 respectively. Cohen also earned several All-American recognition from a number of organizations and media outlets including: the NCAA, STATS FCS and BoxToRow. He was also named to the 2016 Walter Camp Football Championship Subdivision All-American team and he was named a second-team AFCA Football Championship Subdivision Coaches’ All-American selection.

In addition to Cohen, Junior Brandon Parker & Freshman Elijah Bell also earned recognition. Parker was named offensive lineman of the year for the second straight season. Parker also earned conference player of the week honors on five separate occasions. Freshman Elijah Bell was also named conference rookie of the year. In his debut season, Bell set a freshmen school record with 8 touchdown passes; and placed near the top of the MEAC in both yards per reception and receiving yardage.

The following A&T players were also named to the All–MEAC First, Second, and Third Teams:

The Aggies finished the 2016 season ranked 20th nationally both the Coaches & Media polls. This marks the 10 time in the program's history, and also the 3rd time this was accomplished in back to back seasons. The team's win over Kent State was the program's first-ever win over a Division I Football Bowl Subdivision school.

2017 NFL draft

The 2017 NFL Draft was held on April 27–29, 2017 in front of the Philadelphia Museum of Art in Philadelphia, Pennsylvania. The following A&T players were either selected or signed as undrafted free agents following the draft.

Ranking movements

Notes

References

North Carolina AandT
North Carolina A&T Aggies football seasons
North Carolina AandT